Arkham Horror: The Card Game is a cooperative living card game produced by Fantasy Flight Games. It is set in the universe of Chaosium's Call of Cthulhu roleplaying game which is itself based on the Cthulhu Mythos of H.P. Lovecraft and other cosmic horror writers. The title refers to Lovecraft's fictional town of Arkham, Massachusetts which is mentioned in many Mythos stories.

Release 
News of the game was originally leaked in May 2016, before being officially announced in August of that same year. It made its first limited public release at Arkham Nights 2016 to a sold-out crowd.

As a game in Fantasy Flight Games Living Card Game line, there is a regular release of non-random Deluxe expansions that start a story or campaign, followed by multiple smaller expansions (known as Mythos packs) that continue and conclude it.

With the announcement of the Edge of the Earth campaign in 2021, Fantasy Flight stated future expansions would simply be released in two larger boxes, each containing either all of the campaign's story or player cards. During a Gen Con livestream in September 2021, Fantasy Flight Head of Studio Chris Gerber announced all previous expansions would be re-released in the new format, too.

As of the release of the "Scarlet Keys" expansion in 2022, the lead designer MJ Newman has stepped back from her role as the lead developer of the game to become a senior designer at FFG.  Designer Josiah "Duke" Harrist was announced as lead designer with Nick Kory, previously of the MythosBusters Podcast, also joining the design team.

Mechanics 
Campaign play is the default mode of the game, allowing a player to progress through a series of scenarios. In campaign play, choices made in scenarios have lasting effects, altering the story and how later scenarios play out. Each scenario has multiple paths of divergence offering multiple playthroughs with differing experiences each time.

When players prepare to play, they first choose an investigator, most of them having a primary class of Guardian, Survivor, Rogue, Seeker or Mystic. Each investigator deck receives cards that represent weaknesses of their investigator, one specific to each investigator, and one "basic" - drawn at random from a general pool. Investigators will also possess one or more unique cards that represent that individual's specific advantages or abilities, often complimenting the backstory of that investigator. Each investigator also has different starting statistics (Willpower, Intellect, Combat and Agility) which will be tested throughout the game. Players then build their decks from cards in their collection, conforming to the deckbuilding limits outlined by their investigator.

During the game, the investigators work together to progress their investigation towards a positive outcome by fulfilling the requirements set out by the Act deck. However, there are forces working against the investigators, represented by the Agenda deck and encounter deck. Each turn, a doom counter is added to the Agenda deck, acting as a timer for the investigators to complete their objectives. When the total number of doom in play reaches the doom threshold of the agenda card, the agenda will advance, often to negative consequences.

During the Investigation phase, the investigators each take up to three actions. Among other options, actions include playing cards from hand or activating those already in play, moving to or investigating locations and fighting or evading enemies. Depending on the card, cards played from hand during the investigation phase may enter an investigator's play area as an ongoing bonus (an "asset") or simply provide a powerful one-time effect and be discarded upon use (an "event"). Many cards have a resource cost which must be paid to play the card. While cards generally require an action to play, some are "fast" and do not require an action to be played.

The Investigation phase is followed by the Enemy, Upkeep and the Mythos Phase, representing the forces working against the investigators each round. Investigators may have to deal with effects or enemies that attack their sanity, health or simply their progression towards their main goal (the Act deck).

Investigators will be eliminated from a scenario if they receive horror or damage equal to their sanity or health respectively. Investigators eliminated in this way will receive permanent mental or physical trauma. This means investigators repeatedly defeated in scenarios can become progressively weaker as the campaign progresses. Investigators will, however, receive experience from scenarios (even after defeat), which can be spent to improve each investigator's deck. At certain points in a campaign, failure may lead to investigators being killed or driven insane.

Expansions
The main story expansions are grouped into "cycles" that each constitute a complete player campaign. The first six cycles (Dunwich through Innsmouth) consist of one deluxe expansion followed by six mythos packs. Deluxe expansions contain new investigators, about 60 new player cards and the first two scenarios of a campaign, while mythos packs contain about 24 new player cards and a single scenario of a campaign. These are listed below in order of release date, which is also the order in which they are meant to be played. Later cycles, starting with Edge of the Earth, have abandoned the deluxe/mythos format and are instead split into two releases, a "campaign expansion" (featuring all scenarios of the campaign) and an "investigator expansion" (featuring all of the new player cards). This new format release has since been retroactively adopted for the previous cycles.

Standalone scenarios are scenarios that exist outside of a campaign/cycle and are self-contained. As such, a player doesn't need any other expansions to play them or encounter cards from the core box—only the player cards. Stand-alone scenarios are at times printed in house at Fantasy Flight Games and are referred to as Print on Demand (POD). This means the card quality in that case is lower than the packs shipped from overseas but Fantasy Flight Games can push these packs faster out to players at conventions or (in the case of Curse of the Rougarou and Carnevale of Horrors) for general release.

Upgrade expansions (the "Return to" boxes) are akin to the "Nightmare Packs" from the Lord of the Rings LCG. However, instead of just increasing the difficulty, these expansions provide an alternate way to play through the campaign with alternate story effects. They also include a small selection of new player cards (e.g., the first box includes 20 player cards).

The Dunwich Legacy cycle

The Path to Carcosa cycle

The Forgotten Age cycle

The Circle Undone cycle

The Dream-Eaters cycle

The Innsmouth Conspiracy cycle

Edge of the Earth cycle

The Scarlet Keys cycle

Standalone scenarios

Upgrade Expansions

Investigator Starter Decks

Novellas
Arkham Horror: The Card Game also has novellas where each novella is focused around a specific investigator. Each novella comes with 5 promo cards: 1 alternate art investigator card, 1 alternate art mini investigator card, 1 replacement signature card, 1 replacement signature weakness, and 1 card with instructions for using the replacement cards in the game.

References

External links
 

Fantasy Flight Games games
Dedicated deck card games
Cooperative board games
Cthulhu Mythos card games
Horror board games
Board games introduced in 2016